The Sailor's Hornpipe (also known as The College Hornpipe and Jack's the Lad) is a traditional hornpipe melody and linked dance with origins in the Royal Navy.

History
The tune was first printed as the "College Hornpipe" in 1797 or 1798 by J. Dale of London. However, versions of the tune are found in earlier manuscript collections – for example, a syncopated version in the William Vickers manuscript, written on Tyneside, dated 1770. 

The hornpipe dance imitates the life of sailors and their duties aboard ship. Due to the small space that the dance required, and no need for a partner, the dance was popular on-board ship.

Samuel Pepys referred to this tune in his diary as "The Jig of the Ship" and Captain Cook, who took a piper on at least one voyage, is noted to have ordered his men to dance the hornpipe in order to keep them in good health. The dance on-ship became less common when fiddlers ceased to be included in ships' crew members.

In dramatic stage productions, from around the sixteenth century, a popular feature was a sea dance. But the nineteenth century saw the more familiar form of the "sailors' hornpipe" introduced. Nautical duties (for example the hauling of ropes, rowing, climbing the rigging and saluting) provided the dance movements.

During the Last Night of the Proms in London, when the tune is played as part of Sir Henry Wood's Fantasia on British Sea Songs, the spectators bring miniature foghorns and party horns and blow them along to the music, creating a loud, frenetic finale as the music reaches its fastest speed.

The tune was played in the animated Popeye cartoons beginning in the 1930s, usually as the first part of the opening credits theme, which then segued into an instrumental of "I'm Popeye the Sailor Man".

Recordings

This tune has been recorded by:
 Mike Oldfield on Tubular Bells (1973) and Tubular Bells 2003 (2003)
 Achim Reichel as "Piratentanz" on Klabautermann (1977)
 Yo-Yo Ma, Edgar Meyer, and Mark O'Connor on Appalachia Waltz (1996)
 Carlos Núñez on Cinema Do Mar (2005)
 The Spotnicks as "Bach Goes to Sea" in 1963
 The Tornados as "Popeye Twist" in 1962

References

English folk music
Maritime music
1790s songs
Popeye
Sea shanties
Royal Navy traditions